The 2019 Tour Down Under was a road cycling stage race, that took place between 15 and 20 January 2019 in and around Adelaide, South Australia. It was the 21st edition of the Tour Down Under and the first race of the 2019 UCI World Tour.

For the first time in the race's 21-year history, the previous year's winner was able to defend their race title as 's Daryl Impey from South Africa took the overall honours on the final day. Impey had trailed New Zealand's Patrick Bevin by seven seconds going into the stage, finishing at Willunga Hill, but Bevin lost almost six minutes on the day, due to injuries suffered in a crash the previous day. Although Impey finished third on the stage to Australian Richie Porte of  – who won the Willunga stage for the sixth successive year – and  rider Wout Poels from the Netherlands, Impey won the general classification and the race's final ochre jersey by thirteen seconds from Porte, with Poels a further four seconds arrears (due to the bonus seconds on the finish line) in third place.

Despite not winning the race overall, Bevin took the blue jersey awarded for the sprints classification.

Participating teams
As the Tour Down Under was a UCI World Tour event, all eighteen UCI WorldTeams were invited automatically and obliged to enter a team in the race. One other team was given a wildcard entry into the race: UniSA–Australia. Each team was due to enter seven riders, for a total of 133 participants.

Among the field were six previous winners of the race, two of whom – Cameron Meyer, and defending champion Daryl Impey – were racing for the  squad.

Route
The route of the 2019 Tour Down Under was announced at the beginning of August 2018 and centred around the city of Adelaide in South Australia. There were six mass-start road stages and no time trials, with the race concluding with a summit finish at Willunga Hill for the first time. Two days before the start of the Tour, there was a flat criterium race, the People's Choice Classic, which took place in Rymill Park and which was suited for the sprinters. It was won by Caleb Ewan in a sprint finish.

After the People's Choice Classic, it was announced that the second stage would be shortened due to forecasted high temperatures. The following morning, a minor adjustment was made to the finish of the opening stage in Port Adelaide, as a  finishing circuit was removed due to expected strong winds.

Stages

Stage 1
15 January 2019 — North Adelaide to Port Adelaide,

Stage 2
16 January 2019 — Norwood to Angaston,

Stage 3
17 January 2019 — Lobethal to Uraidla,

Stage 4
18 January 2019 — Unley to Campbelltown,

Stage 5
19 January 2019 — Glenelg to Strathalbyn,

Stage 6
20 January 2019 — McLaren Vale to Willunga Hill,

Classification leadership table
In the 2019 Tour Down Under, four different jerseys were awarded. For the general classification, calculated by adding each cyclist's finishing times on each stage, and allowing time bonuses for the first three finishers at intermediate sprints and at the finish of mass-start stages, the leader received an ochre jersey. This classification was considered the most important of the 2018 Tour Down Under, and the winner of the classification was considered the winner of the race.

Additionally, there was a sprints classification, which awarded a blue jersey, a change from green in 2018. In the sprints classification, cyclists received points for finishing in the top 10 in a stage. For winning a stage, a rider earned 15 points, with one point fewer per place down to 6 points for 10th place. Points towards the classification could also be accrued at intermediate sprint points during each stage; these intermediate sprints also offered bonus seconds towards the general classification. There was also a mountains classification, the leadership of which was marked by a white jersey with navy polka dots. In the mountains classification, points were won by reaching the top of a climb before other cyclists, with more points available for the higher-categorised climbs.

The fourth jersey represented the young rider classification, marked by a white jersey. This was decided in the same way as the general classification, but only riders under the age of 26 were eligible to be ranked in the classification. There was also a classification for teams, in which the times of the best three cyclists per team on each stage were added together; the leading team at the end of the race was the team with the lowest total time. In addition, there was a combativity award given after each stage to the rider(s) considered, by a jury, to have "instigated the most attacks, breakaways or assisted their teammates to the best advantage". The winner of the award wore a red number bib in the following stage.

Final classification standings

General classification

Sprints classification

Mountains classification

Young rider classification

Teams classification

Notes

References

External links

2019
2019 UCI World Tour
2019 in Australian sport
January 2019 sports events in Australia